Danieska Carrión (born 9 June 1980) is a female judoka from Cuba, who won the gold medal in the women's extra lightweight division (– 48 kg) at the 2003 Pan American Games in Santo Domingo, Dominican Republic. She twice claimed the bronze medal at the World Judo Championships: in 2001 and 2003.

References

External links
 

1980 births
Living people
Judoka at the 2007 Pan American Games
Cuban female judoka
Pan American Games gold medalists for Cuba
Pan American Games medalists in judo
Medalists at the 2003 Pan American Games
20th-century Cuban women
20th-century Cuban people
21st-century Cuban women